Bittaford is a village about a mile from Ugborough village, in the civil parish of Ugborough, in the South Hams district, in the county of Devon, England. In 2018 it had an estimated population of 855. The village is divided into 2 parts by a railway viaduct.

Amenities 
Bittaford has a community hall, a Methodist church on Exeter Road and a pub called the Horse and Groom on Exeter Road.

References 

Villages in South Hams